In physical chemistry, supersaturation occurs with a solution when the concentration of a solute exceeds the concentration specified by the value of solubility at equilibrium. Most commonly the term is applied to a solution of a solid in a liquid. A supersaturated solution is in a metastable state; it may be brought to equilibrium by forcing the excess of solute to separate from the solution. The term can also be applied to a mixture of gases.

History 

Early studies of the phenomenon were conducted with sodium sulfate, also known as Glauber's Salt because, unusually, the solubility of this salt in water may decrease with increasing temperature. Early studies have been summarised by Tomlinson. It was shown that the crystallization of a supersaturated solution does not simply come from its agitation, (the previous belief) but from solid matter entering and acting as a "starting" site for crystals to form, now called "seeds". Expanding upon this, Gay-Lussac brought attention to the kinematics of salt ions and the characteristics of the container having an impact on the supersaturation state. He was also able to expand upon the number of salts with which a supersaturated solution can be obtained. Later Henri Löwel came to the conclusion that both nuclei of the solution and the walls of the container have a catalyzing effect on the solution that cause crystallization. Explaining and providing a model for this phenomenon has been a task taken on by more recent research. Désiré Gernez contributed to this research by discovering that nuclei must be of the same salt that is being crystallized in order to promote crystallization.

Occurrence and examples

Solid precipitate, liquid solvent
A solution of a chemical compound in a liquid will become supersaturated when the temperature of the saturated solution is changed. In most cases solubility decreases with decreasing temperature; in such cases the excess of solute will rapidly separate from the solution as crystals or an amorphous powder. 
In a few cases the opposite effect occurs. The example of sodium sulfate in water is well-known and this was why it was used in early studies of solubility.

Recrystallization is a process used to purify chemical compounds. A mixture of the impure compound and solvent is heated until the compound has dissolved. If there is some solid impurity remaining it is removed by filtration. When the temperature of the solution is subsequently lowered it briefly becomes supersaturated and then the compound crystallizes out until chemical equilibrium at the lower temperature is achieved. Impurities remain in the supernatant liquid. In some cases crystals do not form quickly and the solution remains supersaturated after cooling. This is because there is a thermodynamic barrier to the formation of a crystal in a liquid medium. Commonly this is overcome by adding a tiny crystal of the solute compound to the supersaturated solution, a process known as "seeding". Another process in common use is to rub a rod on the side of a glass vessel containing the solution to release microscopic glass particles which can act as nucleation centres. In industry, centrifugation is used to separate the crystals from the supernatant liquid.

Some compounds and mixtures of compounds can form long-living supersaturated solutions. Carbohydrates are a class of such compounds; The thermodynamic barrier to formation of crystals is rather high because of extensive and irregular hydrogen bonding with the solvent, water. For example, although sucrose can be recrystallised easily, its hydrolysis product, known as "invert sugar" or "golden syrup" is a mixture of glucose and fructose that exists as a viscous, supersaturated, liquid. Clear honey contains carbohydrates which may crystallize over a period of weeks.

Supersaturation may be encountered when attempting to crystallize a protein.

Gaseous solute, liquid solvent

The solubility of a gas in a liquid increases with increasing gas pressure. When the external pressure is reduced, the excess gas comes out of solution.

Fizzy drinks are made by subjecting the liquid to carbon dioxide, under pressure. In champagne the CO2 is produced naturally in the final stage of fermentation. When the bottle or can is opened some gas is released in the form of bubbles.

Release of gas from the bloodstream can cause a deep-sea diver to suffer from decompression sickness (a.k.a. the bends) when returning to the surface. This can be fatal if the released gas enters the heart.

Dissolved gases can be released during oil exploration when a strike is made. This occurs because the oil in oil-bearing rock is under considerable pressure from the over-lying rock, allowing the oil to be supersaturated with respect to dissolved gases.

Liquid formation from a mixture of gases 

A cloudburst is an extreme form of production of liquid water from a supersaturated mixture of air and water vapour in the atmosphere. Supersaturation in the vapour phase is related to the surface tension of liquids through the Kelvin equation, the Gibbs–Thomson effect and the Poynting effect.

The International Association for the Properties of Water and Steam (IAPWS) provides a special equation for the Gibbs free energy in the metastable-vapor region of water in its Revised Release on the IAPWS Industrial Formulation 1997 for the Thermodynamic Properties of Water and Steam. All thermodynamic properties for the metastable-vapor region of water can be derived from this equation by means of the appropriate relations of thermodynamic properties to the Gibbs free energy.

Measurement 
When measuring the concentration of a solute in a supersaturated gaseous or liquid mixture it is obvious that the pressure inside the cuvette may be greater than the ambient pressure. When this is so a specialized cuvette must be used. The choice of  analytical technique to use will depend on the characteristics of the analyte.

Applications 
The characteristics of supersaturation have practical applications in terms of pharmaceuticals. By creating a supersaturated solution of a certain drug, it can be ingested in liquid form. The drug can be made driven into a supersaturated state through any normal mechanism and then prevented from precipitating out by adding precipitation inhibitors. Drugs in this state are referred to as "supersaturating drug delivery services," or "SDDS." Oral consumption of a drug in this form is simple and allows for the measurement of very precise dosages. Primarily, it provides a means for drugs with very low solubility to be made into aqueous solutions. In addition, some drugs can undergo supersaturation inside the body despite being ingested in a crystalline form. This phenomenon is known as in vivo supersaturation.

The identification of supersaturated solutions can be used as a tool for marine ecologists to study the activity of organisms and populations. Photosynthetic organisms release O2 gas into the water. Thus, an area of the ocean supersaturated with O2 gas can likely determined to be rich with photosynthetic activity. Though some O2 will naturally be found in the ocean due to simple physical chemical properties, upwards of 70% of all oxygen gas found in supersaturated regions can be attributed to photosynthetic activity.

Supersaturation in vapor phase is usually present in the expansion process through steam nozzles that operate with superheated steam at the inlet, which transitions to saturated state at the outlet. Supersaturation thus becomes an important factor to be taken into account in the design of steam turbines, as this results in an actual mass flow of steam through the nozzle being about 1 to 3% greater than the theoretically calculated value that would be expected if the expanding steam underwent a reversible adiabatic process through equilibrium states. In these cases supersaturation occurs due to the fact that the expansion process develops so rapidly and in such a short time, that the expanding vapor cannot reach its equilibrium state in the process, behaving as if it were superheated. Hence the determination of the expansion ratio, relevant to the calculation of the mass flow through the nozzle, must be done using an adiabatic index of approximately 1.3, like that of the superheated steam, instead of 1.135, which is the value that should have to be used for a quasi-static adiabatic expansion in the saturated region.

The study of supersaturation is also relevant to atmospheric studies. Since the 1940s, the presence of supersaturation in the atmosphere has been known. When water is supersaturated in the troposphere, the formation of ice lattices is frequently observed. In a state of saturation, the water particles will not form ice under tropospheric conditions. It is not enough for molecules of water to form an ice lattice at saturation pressures; they require a surface to condense on to or conglomerations of liquid water molecules of water to freeze. For these reasons, relative humidities over ice in the atmosphere can be found above 100%, meaning supersaturation has occurred. Supersaturation of water is actually very common in the upper troposphere, occurring between 20% and 40% of the time. This can be determined using satellite data from the Atmospheric Infrared Sounder.

References 

Thermodynamics
Atmospheric thermodynamics
Underwater diving physics